The International Hair Freezing Contest is a sculpted hair competition held at a resort in the Takhini Hot Springs, Whitehorse, Yukon, Canada. The annual competition involves participants sitting in a hot spring and sculpting their wet hair in cold temperatures. After about a minute, the hair freezes. The form of their hair at that time represents their contest entry. The contest is held each February and was started in 2011. First prize is $2000.

References

External links
 Official site
 Image of 2018 winners

Competitions in Canada
Tourist attractions in Yukon